The European Assembly Elections Act 1978 (c 10) also known as the European Parliamentary Elections Act 1978 was an Act of the Parliament of the United Kingdom that made provision for the holding of elections of representatives to the European Assembly from the United Kingdom. It made provision for the election of 81 "Representatives to the Assembly" (which would later become Members of the European Parliament (MEPs)) to the European Assembly with 66 members being elected from England, 8 from Scotland, 4 from Wales using the first past the post electoral system in 78 one member constituencies and 3 members from Northern Ireland using the Single transferable vote in a single constituency. The act also prevented any increase in the powers of the Assembly from being ratified unless approved by a further Act of Parliament. The first elections took place on Thursday 7 June 1979.

See also
European Parliamentary Elections Act 1993
European Parliamentary Elections Act 1999
European Parliamentary Elections Act 2002
Elections in the United Kingdom
 List of Acts of the Parliament of the United Kingdom relating to the European Communities (1957-1993) & European Union (1993- )

United Kingdom Acts of Parliament 1978
Acts of the Parliament of the United Kingdom relating to the European Union
European Parliament elections in the United Kingdom
Election law in the United Kingdom